Julia Nannie Wallace  (21 December 1907 – 12 December 1991) was a notable New Zealand teacher, principal, community leader and local politician. She was born in La Crosse, Wisconsin, United States in 1907. She was the first woman to be elected onto Palmerston North City Council in 1962 and served as a city councillor until 1968. In the 1968 Queen's Birthday Honours, she was appointed an Officer of the Order of the British Empire, in recognition of her service as principal of Palmerston North Girls' High School.

References

1907 births
1991 deaths
Politicians from La Crosse, Wisconsin
American emigrants to New Zealand
Heads of schools in New Zealand
Palmerston North City Councillors
New Zealand Officers of the Order of the British Empire
20th-century New Zealand politicians